The 2015–16 Greek Volleyleague season is the 48th season of the Greek Volleyleague, the highest tier professional volley league in Greece. The winner of the league was PAOK, which beat Foinikas Syros 3–1 in the league's playoff's finals. It was the second championship of PAOK. The clubs Aris Thessaloniki and Lamia were relegated to the A2 Ethniki.

Teams
12 teams participate in the 2015–16 Volleyleague.
The 10 highest ranked teams from the 2014–15 Volleyleague final standings: PAOK, Olympiacos, Foinikas Syros, Panathinaikos, Kifissia, Ethnikos Alexandroupolis, Pamvohaikos, Orestiada, Aris and Lamia.
The 2 promoted teams from the A2 Ethniki 2014–15: Iraklis and Panachaiki.

Regular season

League table

 

|}

Source: volleyleague.gr

Results

Play-off (1-4)
The four teams that finished in the places 1 to 4 in the Regular season, compete in the Play-off (1-4).

Semi-finals
In the Playoff's semi-finals, the team that finished in the 1st place in the Regular season plays against the 4th and the 2nd placed team plays against the 3rd. To qualify to the Final the teams must win three games. The teams that finished 1st and 2nd in the Regular season, will be played the first, the second and the fifth (if it is necessary) game of the series at home.

Olympiacos – PAOK (1–3) 

|}

Kifissia – Foinikas Syros (1–3) 

|}

Final
In the Playoff's final the two qualified teams play against each other in a series where the team winning three games will become the 2015–16 Volleyleague championship. The team that finished in the higher Regular season place will be played the first, the third and the fifth (if it is necessary) game of the series at home.

Foinikas Syros – PAOK (1–3) 

|}

Final standings

External links
Greek Volleyleague, Official Page
Greek Volleyball Federation

2015 in volleyball
2016 in volleyball
Volleyball competitions in Greece
2015 in Greek sport
2016 in Greek sport
Greece